Francesc Xavier Arnau Grabalosa (23 March 1975 – 22 May 2021) was a Spanish footballer who played as a goalkeeper.

In a 16-year professional career he played for Barcelona and Málaga, appearing in 126 La Liga games over the course of 12 seasons. He later worked as a sporting director.

Club career

Barcelona
Born in Les Planes d'Hostoles, Girona, Catalonia, Arnau was a youth graduate from La Liga powerhouse FC Barcelona. He made his first-team debut in 1996–97, in a 3–3 home draw against Atlético Madrid on 9 November 1996.

Arnau was second choice to Vítor Baía, Ruud Hesp and Pepe Reina for several seasons, while also registered with the reserves.

Málaga
For the 2001–02 campaign, Arnau moved to Málaga CF for € 2.1 million, also playing second-fiddle until the departure of Pedro Contreras to Real Betis in 2003. He would eventually become team captain, but lost his job in 2007–08 in the Segunda División, to Iñaki Goitia.

Goitia was sold also to Betis in summer 2009, but Gustavo Munúa and Roberto Santamaría were also acquired, so Arnau was demoted to as low as third choice. He eventually finished as backup to the Uruguayan, without making one single competitive appearance.

After Munúa's departure, Arnau played the first game of the 2010–11 season – a 3–1 home loss against Valencia CF – as Rodrigo Galatto was not yet eligible. He continued appearing regularly for the side in the following weeks after the Brazilian performed poorly and another new signing, Rubén, went down with an injury.

Arnau played his last match as a professional on 21 May 2011, coming on as a substitute for Willy Caballero in the last minutes of a 1–3 home defeat to his first club Barcelona, with Málaga finally retaining its top-flight status.

International career
Arnau appeared for Spain at the 1998 UEFA European Under-21 Championship, being named the tournament's MVP as the country emerged victorious.

Post-retirement
After retiring at the age of 36, Arnau continued working with his last club as a youth coach, alongside former teammate Salva. The former became Málaga's new director of football on 15 December 2015, in replacement of Armando Husillos. In October 2017, after a poor start to the season saw the side placed last in the top tier, he was dismissed and replaced by his predecessor.

Arnau signed with Real Oviedo on 3 December 2019 in the same capacity, on a deal until June 2022.

Death
On 22 May 2021, Arnau was found dead in Oviedo's railway station of La Corredoria, aged 46. It was later revealed that he committed suicide.

Honours
Barcelona
La Liga: 1998–99

Spain U21
UEFA European Under-21 Championship: 1998

See also
Pelayo Novo

References

External links

1975 births
2021 deaths
2021 suicides
People from Garrotxa
Sportspeople from the Province of Girona
Spanish footballers
Footballers from Catalonia
Association football goalkeepers
La Liga players
Segunda División players
Segunda División B players
FC Barcelona Atlètic players
FC Barcelona players
Málaga CF players
Spain under-21 international footballers
Spain under-23 international footballers
Catalonia international footballers
Málaga CF non-playing staff
Real Oviedo non-playing staff
Suicides by train
Suicides in Spain